Jules Mayné (15 August 1892 – 30 May 1977) was a Belgian footballer. He played in three matches for the Belgium national football team from 1912 to 1913.

References

External links
 

1892 births
1977 deaths
Belgian footballers
Belgium international footballers
Place of birth missing
Association football goalkeepers